Bente Haukland Næss (born 25 September 1954) is the former chair of the Norwegian Consumer Council. She is the CEO of Rembra, an engineering consultancy firm.

She has been a member of the board of Norsk Forening for Kvalitet og Risikostyring, the Ideas Bank Foundation, and Varingen.

A cand.mag. by education, she has been a member of Nittedal municipal council for sixteen years, representing the Christian Democratic Party. She resides in Hagan.

References

1954 births
Living people
People from Nittedal
Directors of government agencies of Norway
Akershus politicians
Christian Democratic Party (Norway) politicians
Norwegian women in politics